The Eola Hills are a range of hills northwest of Salem, Oregon, United States.

They are divided from the Salem Hills by the Willamette River at Eola.

See also
Eola-Amity Hills AVA
Bethel Heights Vineyard, one of the first vineyards planted on the Eola Hills

References 

Hills of Oregon
Landforms of Yamhill County, Oregon
Landforms of Polk County, Oregon